"You Won't Let Me" is a song by American recording artist Rachael Yamagata from her third studio album Chesapeake (2011). It was written by Yamagata and Mike Viola, with Indaba Music producing the track. Described as a "pleading ballad", the song is about "showing someone how to laugh".

Karise Eden cover version

"You Won't Let Me" is the debut single by Australian singer-songwriter Karise Eden who won the first season of The Voice (Australia). It was released as a digital download in Australia on 19 June 2012 as the lead single from her debut studio album My Journey (2012), on 19 June 2012. The song peaked at number five on the ARIA Singles Charts.

Track listing
Digital download
"You Won't Let Me" – 3:34

CD single
"You Won't Let Me" – 3:34
"Nothings Real But Love – The Voice Performance" – 2:55
"You Won’t Let Me – Instrumental" – 3:34

Charts

Certifications

Release history

References

2012 debut singles
Karise Eden songs
Songs written by Mike Viola
2011 songs
Universal Records singles